Kristen O'Neill (born April 12, 1983) is an American women's basketball player, a 6'1 versatile guard, formerly playing at the University of Washington. She was a three-time co-captain and four-year starter. She played for FIBA's Euroleague teams in Madrid and Burgos, Spain and in Ireland.  In 2008, O'Neill returned to Seattle and played in the WNBA for the Seattle Storm. She is currently the Associate Head Women's Basketball coach for Seattle University.

High school 
O'Neill played at Meadowdale High School. She was a Parade Magazine All-American, Gatorade Player of the Year for the state of Washington, and one of the top recruits in the country in 2001 (ranked No. 38 among top 750 seniors in class of 2001 by All-Star Girls Report and ranked No. 19 on HoopPlanet.com's list of top 100 recruits for 2001).

College 
O'Neill played at the University of Washington from 2001–2006 where she was a three-time co-captain and four-year starter. She was UW's Defensive Player of the Year twice (2002 and 2003), a 2002 Pacific-10 All-Freshman Team honoree and the Coaches Award recipient in 2006.  O'Neill graduated with honors in 2006 with a degree in communication.

Washington statistics

Source

Professionally 
O'Neill, a local fan favorite, played for the Seattle Storm during the 2008 season. She declined an invite to training camp in 2009 due to a knee injury.

Coaching 

O'Neill was hired on as an assistant for Seattle University in 2009 by Joan Bonvicini. She was appointed to Associate Head Coach in 2012.

References

External links
WNBA stats at basketball-reference.com

1983 births
Living people
American expatriate basketball people in Ireland
American expatriate basketball people in Spain
American women's basketball players
Basketball players from Washington (state)
Parade High School All-Americans (girls' basketball)
Seattle Redhawks women's basketball coaches
Seattle Storm players
Shooting guards
Small forwards
Washington Huskies women's basketball players
American women's basketball coaches
Undrafted Women's National Basketball Association players